Old Mother Riley, Headmistress  is a low budget black and white 1950 British comedy film, starring Arthur Lucan and Kitty McShane. The 13th film in the Old Mother Riley series, it features the Luton Girls Choir playing many of Mother Riley's pupils.

Plot summary
Daughter Kitty is sacked from her job as music teacher at an exclusive girls school, but Mother Riley unexpectedly comes into an inheritance, and decides to buy the girls finishing school and give Kitty her job back. Mother Riley soon establishes herself as headmistress at St. Mildred's School for Young Ladies, and throws herself into her new role with vigour, whether it's taking P.E. lessons, brazenly cheating on Sports Day, or confronting the haunted school piano.

Cast
 Arthur Lucan as Daphne Snowdrop Bluebell Riley
 Kitty McShane as Kitty Riley
 The Luton Girls Choir as School choir
 Willer Neal as Bill Travers
 Cyril Smith as Maltby
 C. Denier Warren as Clifton Hill
 Enid Hewitt as Miss Helen Carruthers
 Paul Sheridan as Nixon
 Harry Herbert as Simon
 Oswald Waller as Copeland
 Jenny Mathot as Mlle Leblanc
 Myrette Morven as Miss Chester
 Ethel Royal as Lady Meersham
 Bill Stephens as Mayor
 Catherine Carleton as Miss Ashton
 Dorothy Darke as Mrs Shaw
 Vi Kaley as 1st laundry girl
 Jaqueline Stanley as 2nd laundry girl
 Maisie ...	Beth Ross as Maisie
 Madge Brindley as Mrs Clarke
 Pamela Hill as Woman
 Graham Tonbridge as Chauffeur
 Patricia Owens, Genine Graham, Joy Frankau, Betty Benson, Mary Thompson, Suzanne Wilde, Doorn Van Steyne, Coral Woods, Joy Adams, Cora Farrel, Sally Owen, Lyn James, Ursula Hopwood, and Diana Connell as girls

Critical reception
Anthony Nield wrote in The Digital Fix, " whilst the idea of Old Mother Riley owning her own girls’ school should provide plenty of comic mileage, we’re still faced with some pointless musical numbers to pad things out...(but) there’s a chirpiness and a punch in the screenplay which is hard not to enjoy. Of course, any level of sophistication is kept at a bare minimum (Lucan was never the subtlest of actors; he performed for the camera just as he did on the stage), but in its own way …Headmistress has an energy equal to that of, say, Hellzapoppin' or the Marx Brothers A Night in Casablanca, even if both are far superior and much funnier. There’s a non-stop quality to the gags which, whilst the film may ultimately be forgettable, amounts to great deal of fun. Certainly, for a thirteenth entry in a big screen franchise (and one made almost as many years after the first), it’s far better than we should rightfully expect."
TV Guide noted,  "a poor addition to the "Old Mother Riley" stable...If you see only one "Old Mother Riley" film in your lifetime, don't make it this one."
"Fielding's Review"  wrote, "lots of fun gags in this one. Along with Old Mother Riley Meets the Vampire, it’s the best of the set."

References

External links
 

1950 films
1950 comedy films
British comedy films
Films directed by John Harlow
British black-and-white films
1950s English-language films
1950s British films